Street Cry (11 March 1998 – 17 September 2014) was a Thoroughbred racehorse, winner of the 2002 Dubai World Cup, the 2002 Stephen Foster Handicap and runner up in the 2002 Whitney Handicap. He was an international shuttle stallion that stood at the Darley Studs in Australia and the US.

He is noteworthy for being the sire of one of the greatest racehorses of all time, Winx, who was retired from racing in April 2019 with a world record of 25 Group 1 wins and also won the last 33 races of her career, the longest winning streak for a top-level racehorse in over a century. At her retirement, she was rated by Longines as the best racehorse in the world. He is also the sire of US racing sensation Zenyatta.

Owned and bred by Sheikh Mohammed's Godolphin Racing, he was by the dual Group One (G1) winner Machiavellian, a son of Mr. Prospector. His dam, Helen Street (dam of nine winners) won the 1985 Irish Oaks and was by multiple Group 1 winner Troy.

Racing record

Two-year-old
After winning his maiden race, Street Cry placed second in the Del Mar Futurity (G2) and Norfolk Stakes (United States) (G2), before running third in the Breeders' Cup Juvenile (G1).

Three-year-old
Street Cry won the UAE 2,000 Guineas, then placed second in both the UAE Derby (G3) and Discovery Handicap (G3), at Aqueduct.

Four-year-old
Won Dubai World Cup (G1), won Stephen Foster H (G1), and was second in the Whitney Handicap (G1).

Stud record
In America, Street Cry stood at Darley's Jonabell Farm in Lexington, Kentucky, for $150,000. After a two-year break, Street Cry returned in 2009 for a fifth season at Darley Stud, Kelvinside, in the Hunter Region  where he stood at a fee of A$110,000. During those five seasons in Australia, he covered 425 mares to produce 319 foals.

Darley's Chief Operating Officer, Oliver Tait, says that Street Cry produced "easy horses to train" that are "tough, willing, and genuine." Physically, his offspring have succeeded on "all distances and all surfaces" and "show incredible acceleration" so that they are "incredibly effective in the last quarter-mile of the race."

He was euthanized in Australia on September 17, 2014, as a result of complications of a neurological condition.

At the time of his death, he had sired 7 grade I winners in the Northern Hemisphere, including 2010 Horse of the Year Zenyatta; Street Sense, who won the 2007 Kentucky Derby; and grade I-winning sprinter Street Boss, who won the Grade I Triple Bend Invitational Handicap and Bing Crosby Handicap.

His most notable progeny is Winx, rated as the best racehorse in the world and the winner of an unprecedented four Cox Plates. Winx was the 2015-16-17-18 Australian Horse of the Year and was retired from racing in April 2019 having won the last 33 races of her career plus a world record 25 Group 1s. Among her best wins are the Cox Plate (four times) and Doncaster Mile.

Other notable progeny include Group I winner Majestic Roi, winner of the Sun Chariot Stakes (G1) in England;  Caulfield Guineas winners in Long John in 2013 and  Whobegotyou; Shocking, winner of the 2009 Melbourne Cup;  Street Hero, winner of Norfolk Stakes, Tomcito who raced as a two-year-old in Peru winning two important G1 races against older horses; and Winx,

Street Cry's two most famous daughters, Zenyatta (United States) and Winx (Australia), each reached the pinnacle in the sport of horse racing.

In the southern hemisphere his progeny included 107 yearlings sold for an average of $50,000 and a top price of $400,000. During 2009: 28 yearlings were sold; averaging $63,000 with a top price of $400,000.  In the northern hemisphere: 164 yearlings sold for an average $165,000; top price $950,000.  In 2008: 35 sold; average $174,000; top price $484,000.

Notable progeny

c = colt, f = filly, g = gelding

Pedigree

References

1998 racehorse births
2014 racehorse deaths
Racehorses bred in Ireland
Racehorses trained in the United States
Dubai World Cup winners
Thoroughbred family 1-l